Conotyla blakei is a species of millipede in the family Conotylidae. It is found in North America.

References

Further reading

 

Chordeumatida
Millipedes of North America
Articles created by Qbugbot
Animals described in 1932